Kyle Bailey may refer to:

Kyle Bailey (basketball) (born 1982), American basketball player and coach
Kyle Bailey (politician), American state legislator in Maine
Kyle Bailey (born 1986), Canadian ice hockey player drafted by the Minnesota Wild in the 2005 NHL Entry Draft
Kyle Bailey, football player with  Sheerwater F.C.
Kyle Bailey, member of the 2009–10 Connecticut Huskies men's basketball team
Kyle Bailey, member of the 2012 Clemson Tigers baseball team